Back on My Baby Jesus Sh!t Again is the second extended play by American rapper DaBaby. It was released through Interscope Records and South Coast on November 12, 2021. The EP features guest appearances from Kodak Black and 21 Savage. It serves as the sequel to DaBaby's tenth mixtape, Back on My Baby Jesus Sh!t (2017).

Background
DaBaby announced the EP and its artwork on November 5, 2021. The EP sees DaBaby "rapping in his purest form". Although the EP did not hit the forefront of the Apple Music charts, American record producer Timbaland praised it, saying it "is hard".

Track listing

Charts

References

DaBaby albums
2021 EPs
2021 debut EPs
Interscope Records EPs
Albums produced by London on da Track